Video G∞ver is a High and Mighty Color video compilation released in 2006. It included the promotion videos for Pride, Over, Run Run Run and Days as well as advertising TV-spots for the individual Singles and alternate video versions. All four Songs were part of the Go Over album, released in 2005.

Track list
 Pride
 Over
 Run Run Run
 Days
 Pride TV-Spot
 Over TV-Spot
 Run Run Run TV-Spot
 Days TV-Spot
 Go over TV-Spot
 Over – precious version
 DAYS – director's cut
 2005.9.14 Put On Happiness – Opening Movie

References 

High and Mighty Color albums